Operation Smile is a nonprofit medical service organization founded in 1982 by Dr. William P. Magee Jr. and his wife Kathleen (Kathy) S. Magee. It is headquartered in Virginia Beach, Virginia.

In addition to providing cleft lip and palate repair surgeries to children worldwide, Operation Smile works as a non-governmental organization to reduce the occurrence of cleft lips and palates worldwide. 

Operation Smile has provided over 220,000 surgeries for children and young adults born with cleft lips, cleft palates, and other facial deformities in over 60 countries since 1982, at no cost to the recipients. As of 2018, Operation Smile provided on-going care around the world at 34 smile centers. According to its tax report, Operation Smile completed 156 medical missions in 80 sites globally, including 13 sites in extremely poor regions. During missions, over 35,000 dental procedures were performed in the year 2018.

Early History of Operation Smile 

Operation Smile was founded by Bill and Kathy Magee (Dr. William P. Magee Jr., D.D.S., M.D. and Kathleen S. Magee, B.S.N., M.Ed., M.S.W.). In 1982 Bill Magee, a plastic surgeon, and Kathy Magee, who was then a social worker and a nurse, were invited to join a Philippine cleft repair mission with a group of medical volunteers. When they realized that the group would not return to the Philippines though there were many remaining who needed surgery, they established Operation Smile, Bill Magee said,

The Magee's completed two return trips to Naga City, treating 400 children. The scope of the organization increased after Mother Teresa invited Operation Smile to come to India to treat deformed children. In 1987, Operation Smile launched the Physicians’ Program, which brought doctors from the countries where it hosted medical missions to Norfolk, Virginia, to train with Bill Magee. That same year Operation Smile completed its First medical mission to Kenya. Within the next two years, Operation Smile received a Presidential Citation for Private Sector Initiatives from President Ronald Reagan, and was adopted as a service project by the General Federation of Women’s Clubs. In 1995, Operation Smile opened its first care center, offering patients cleft treatments year-round, in Duitama, Colombia. After establishing the Global Headquarters location in Norfolk, VA, Operation Smile began foundations in different countries like Australia, UK, Italy, Vietnam, and Ireland.

Programs

Surgical missions
For each mission, Operation Smile verifies the credentials and organizes the participation and travel arrangements for a team of volunteers. The team typically includes a mission site coordinator, plastic surgeons, anesthesiologists, a pediatrician, an intensive care physician, head or coordinating nurse, pre- and post-op nurses, child development specialists, speech pathologists, dentists and/or orthodontists.

During the fiscal year of 2018, Operation Smile hosted 156 medical missions in 80 unique sites around the world and provided free surgical care for over 12,00 children and young adults. Nearly 82% of medical professionals volunteering with Operation Smile were from low and middle income countries. Medical volunteers provided approximately 397,312 hours of free care for Operation Smile's patients.

Mission Scheme
Typically, a surgical mission takes four days: from a Thursday to a Sunday. 

The first day is for Screening. Commonly, near the hospital, the logistics team prepares an area where volunteers will be supervising each child. The layout of the place consists of a station-based distribution, where each specialized doctor has its own space. When patients arrive, they are asked to take a seat and wait until a student volunteer begins the process. Most of patients are babies and toddlers, so they are accompanied by their mothers or by any other member of their family. It is important to mention that children should not be sick in order to be eligible for a surgery. Once a student volunteer reaches out to a family, he will guide them through each station. The first station is for data validation, where a volunteer validates patients ID, birth certificate, laboratory exams and previous clinical history. In the second station, a team of photographers is in charge of taking several pictures of the child's malformation from different angles, which will be a resource for surgeons. After these two stations are completed, the order of the following ones may vary from country to country. However, it must include a visit with a plastic surgeon, anesthesiologist, a pediatrician, an intensive care physician, head or coordinating nurse, psychologist, and dentist. Each specialist evaluates the candidate and, at the end of the day, publishes the list of the children who will be in surgery, detailing day and hour. There are approximately 30-35 children per day. 

Friday, Saturday and Sunday are for surgery. For the volunteers, the day starts at 6:00 am, because they have to go to the hospital and prepare the materials they need for the procedures. Patients start to arrive around 8:00 am. Children must be fasting since the night prior as they will need to be anesthetized. Patients and their mothers gather in the waiting room. Depending on the schedule, a volunteer takes the patient for pre-op preparation. They are changed from their clothes into surgical ones and subsequently taken to a pre-op room. This area is called "CLS", meaning Child Life Support. Volunteers and psychologists are there to play with the children and help them be less scared. This area is also meant for volunteers to teach patients how to inhale anesthesia once they are in the surgery room. To do this, among the toys, there are the anesthesia masks. Usually, children spend 1 hour in this area. Then, when everything inside is ready, a nurse comes and takes the child to the surgery room. Once there, the surgery takes approximately 45 minutes. When it is finished, the patient is moved to a post-op room until doctors are sure the kid is stable. Then, the patient is taken to an assigned hospitalization room, where family can take care. Similarly, a nurse comes in to every room to administrate medication and juice to each patient. Finally, next morning, these patients leave and the new ones arrive. 

A week after the surgery, the kid needs to be taken to the local foundation installations to a complete post-op control. Similarly, they will need to continue with language therapy to develop their speaking skills.

World Care Program
Patients with conditions too serious to treat in their own countries can become World Care patients and come to the United States. On a case by case basis, Operation Smile will bring severe craniofacial cases to Norfolk, Virginia, and all around the U.S. when mission conditions are inappropriate for the severity of the case. As of June 2007, approximately 200 world care patients had been treated.

Foundations
Operation Smile has in-country global foundations that raise money and awareness to support its programs. Mission teams are hosted by international foundations that are responsible for in-country logistics, fund raising and mission awareness.  Through partnerships with the American Heart Association, as well as with medical and teaching institutions, healthcare professionals from developing countries receive evidence-based education and hands-on training and mentoring. Operation smile also has sponsored conferences, seminar workshops, rotation programs, visiting professorships, and short and long term fellowships.

To aid countries in becoming self-sufficient at caring for cleft patients, beginning in early 2007 the organization planned to open comprehensive care medical clinics in Colombia, Honduras, Morocco, China, India, the Philippines and Vietnam. The centers provide surgeries and treatment, educate local volunteers, perform local development activities and manage local communications / administrative services. The center in Vietnam expected to treat 2,000 patients annually and to train about 1,000 medical professionals. As of 2018, Operation Smile now offers over 30 comprehensive care clinics around the world.

Education
The annual Operation Smile Physicians' Training Program (PTP) brings surgeons from around the world to the United States for training in specialized surgical skills. The program has helped train more than 650 international physicians in advanced craniofacial techniques.

Operation Smile has hosted two global summits on medical standards in Norfolk, Virginia. Operation Smile attempts to hold yearly summits to offer medical training and advancement for medical workers around the globe. In 2017, they partnered with St. Luke's Medical Center in the Philippines to offer medically-focused skills workshops to its participants.

Student programs
Operation Smile student programs encourages students to lead clubs and raise awareness of health in other countries. Operation Smile offers students different opportunities to get involved in the problem to be solved while they develop their leadership skills. 

ISLC: Students from around the world engage through an annual International Student Leadership Conference (ISLC), which convenes high school freshmen, sophomores and juniors who want to make a difference in global health. Once every year, hundreds of students from around the world meet to discuss the world's issues and how to solve them with a specific focus on medical care equity. In 2018, the ISLC that took place in Seattle, WA included more than 300 students from across the globe, including China, Vietnam, Ireland, Panama, South Africa and Canada that learned how to advocate for children born with a cleft lip, cleft palate or other facial deformity. During the conference, students also learned about global health, joined in peer-to-peer leadership training and participated in service projects to benefit Operation Smile patients, as well as staff at Seattle Children’s Hospital. In 2019, the conference took place in North Carolina. Due to the pandemic, ISCL editions from 2020 and 2021 did not take place. However, the 2022 edition was successfully held at the University of Miami, Florida. 

LEA: Students from Latin-American have their own annual conference, Latinoamérica en Acción (LEA), which gathers high school and college students in a week long event. This regional conference focuses on developing leadership skills among all volunteers, with conferences and workshops from experts. Similarly, another goal is to share ideas of actions that are taken in each country, as the socioeconomic conditions for most of them are similar. Not only ideas are shared, but culture and traditions. This conference strongly motivates students to share the most of their country with others, and for this reasons every night there are cultural events where dance representations and food fairs take place to enhance visibility of each country.

Step Up and U-Lead:Global symposiums for college volunteers to keep students involved and motivated. These events are shorter than ISLC and LEA. During the COVID-19 pandemic, they here held virtually. 

MTW: Operation Smile offers students the opportunity to qualify to travel internationally. Before the students go on a mission, they must apply and be selected to attend one of two annual Mission Training Workshops (MTW). The workshops cover four health modules: dental hygiene, oral re-hydration therapy, nutrition, and burn care and prevention. Students make posters for each of these modules and present them on the missions, educating families on simple life-safety principles. At OpSmile headquarters, students train as mission ambassadors in developing countries. On training completion, students may be selected for an international mission.

Global Essential Surgery Initiatives 
In rural northeastern Nicaragua, work is underway through a pilot project called Cirugía para el Pueblo – “Surgery for the People.” Operation Smile and the Ministry of Health seek to improve the surgical infrastructure of the hospitals and to spread awareness about surgically-treatable conditions to the people of the region.

Operation Smile offers education in safe surgical conditions in Ethiopia and Rwanda, where they have offered surgical training rotations for general surgeons to learn reconstructive plastic surgery techniques — since 2012 in Ethiopia and since 2015 in Rwanda.  The two-week training courses for Ethiopian surgeons, anesthesiologists and nurses take place at JUSH (Jimma University Specialized Hospital), the only hospital serving the 15 million-plus people living in Ethiopia’s southwestern region. The rotations cover cleft surgery as well as techniques to better heal burn, trauma and surgical wounds, representing the bulk of the hospital’s plastic surgery cases.

Starting in 2015, Operation Smile partnered with the University of Rwanda, Partners In Health and the Rwandan Ministry of Health to host twice-annual surgical training rotations. Since then, 17 Rwandan general surgery residents have received hands-on training and education through the rotations. Operation Smile has also worked to improve the skills of local anesthesiologists. Through a grant secured by Operation Smile Sweden through the Swedish Postcode Lottery, Operation Smile will help establish the country’s first-ever postgraduate reconstructive plastic surgery certification program in partnership with the University of Rwanda and Rwanda’s ministries of education and health. The program is scheduled to begin in September 2019 with its first graduates receiving certifications in 2022.

On April 2, 2019, the Vietnam Ministry of Health hosted a conference on patient safety and surgical safety that involved Operation Smile's participation. The achievement of collaboration between the Medical Services Administration of Vietnam MoH and Operation Smile comes after a Memorandum of Understanding was signed in 2014 with a goal to increase access to quality standards for safe surgery in Vietnam. During the recent conference, Operation Smile worked with the MoH, World Health Organization, and other organizations, to implement the set of eight Quality Standards for Safe Surgery. The project started with the assessment of current surgical capacity in the country and included hospitals representing all socio-economic zones in Vietnam. The assessment results served as the baseline information for specialists to develop appropriate and feasible safe surgery standards for Vietnam. The drafting team used WHOs' document "Safe Surgery Saves Lives," as well as Operation Smile's Global Standards of Care as references for development of the Standards. The adoption of Safe Surgery Standards will have potential to impact three million surgeries annually throughout Vietnam.

Awards and milestones
In 1996, Operation Smile was the first recipient of the Conrad N. Hilton Humanitarian Prize. In 1997, Bill Magee and Kathy Magee receive the Servitor Pacis Award from The Path to Peace Foundation. In 1999, Kathleen Magee was awarded the World of Children Award for her contributions to helping vulnerable children through her efforts with Operation Smile.
Bill Magee received the 2001 Antonio Feltrinelli Prize (Premi "Antonio Feltrinelli") awarded by the Accademia Nazionale dei Lincei, which represents the National Academy of Science in Italy, for Exceptional Endeavors of Outstanding Moral and Humanitarian Value. Dr. Magee presented the  Honorary Kazanjian Lecture to the American Society of Plastic and Reconstructive Surgeons, and in 1998 received the Distinguished Service Award from the American Society of Plastic Surgeons.  Kathleen Magee received the 1997 Servants of Peace Award from the U.N. Representative to the Vatican.

In 2001 a documentary on the work by Operation Smile won the Best Medical Documentary at the US Circle of Excellence Media Awards and was a finalist in the New York Film Festival Awards for Best Humanitarian Documentary. The Facemakers: Operation Smile is a co-production by BBC One and the Discovery Channel in conjunction with Century Films. It documents the remarkable changes that occurred in the lives of three children as a result of Operation Smile's visit to Davao City in the Philippines in 1999. The fifty-minute programme was first aired on 21 June 2001. Two of the children received surgery during the mission. Nine-year-old Rozal Garces was treated for her cleft lip, and four-year-old Amorjoy Felipe had a cleft lip and palate revision. The third child, Abel Gastardo, had a condition too severe to be treated during the time of the mission. Abel suffered from a nasofrontal facial encephalocele, an extreme protrusion of brain tissue from the front of his skull. The film follows Abel to the United States to receive corrective surgery, seven months later. He was brought over by Operation Smile to receive major surgery in Virginia at the Children's Hospital of The King's Daughters.
 To mark its 25th anniversary in November 2007, Operation Smile undertook the World Journey of Smiles (WJOS), a single campaign that included 40 simultaneous missions over a period of two weeks in 25 countries—beginning with the return to the site of Operations Smile's first mission. 
 Bill and Kathy Magee were honored on March 1, 2008, with the Norfolk First Citizen Distinguished Service Award.
Bill Magee was awarded the American Society of Plastic Surgeons’ Honorary Citation Award in 2014, and the American Society of Maxillofacial Surgeons’ Tagliacozzi Award in 2013.
In 2014, Kathy Magee received a prestigious honorary doctorate from the Karolinska Institute in Sweden. She has also remained active in the World of Children organization and serves as a member of the Executive Committee for the Hilton Laureates Collaborative.

1999-2002: Criticism and response
In November 1999, specific patient deaths brought criticism on Operation Smile's medical procedures, suggesting the organization prioritized publicity and volume over patient welfare and safety. In response, Operation Smile conducted an internal review. Initially, the organization "promised to make public the full findings of the review", though later chose not to release the findings, considering the review an internal matter. Several directors disagreed with this choice and left the board. Four months after announcing the review, the organization publicly acknowledged organizational flaws. By 2002, the organization also established medical credential standards, improved medical monitoring of patients, and implemented quality and financial controls.

Operation Smile and Smile Train
In early 2011, Smile Train and Operation Smile announced the two charities would merge, followed three weeks later by announcements the merger had been aborted, Smile Train having canceled the union.  Smile Train's board also named Priscilla Ma the executive director of the organization, while other board members and directors stepped down.

Following the failed merger, Operation Smile "spun-off" the Operation Smile Foundation. The Foundation was renamed Stop Cleft International, a 501(c)3 organization. Stop Cleft International became a subsidiary of Smile Train in July, 2013. Operation Smile paid an agreed upon obligation of $4,000,000 to Stop Cleft International/Smile Train during tax year 2013.

In 2009, Smile Train initiated an advertising campaign  in the Richmond Times highlighting Smile Train's attempts between 2006 and 2009 to donate nearly $9 million to Operation Smile, the organization Brian Mullaney had split from in 1998 in what Mullaney described as a "messy divorce."

In the ad, Mullaney contended Operation Smile was refusing money that could benefit children, later calling the situation "shameful"; Mullaney also noted that he respects that in some countries need overwhelms available doctors and he had "a newfound respect for what Operation Smile does." The Virginian Pilot outlined the history and differences between the two organizations and indicated Mullaney wanted the two organizations to reconcile.

At the time, Bill Magee of Operation Smile declined a newspaper interview, and Operation Smile formally responded to the ad campaign, saying the two organizations "have different operating philosophies and business ethics," and that Operation Smile would continue foregoing donations from an "unproductive relationship."

Financial information
 In 2011, Forbes ranked Operation Smile as the tenth "least efficient" large U.S. charity, tied with the Alzheimer's Association and just ahead in efficiency of the American Cancer Society. Forbes noted that "financial efficiency is far from the whole story when it comes to assessing a charity's vitality or even effectiveness."
 Operation Smile spends 42% of the money donated to the charity on fundraising and administration, including a salary of $350,000 (and an additional $27,915 in other compensation) for its chief executive.
 The NGO raised $35,024,864 during the fiscal year ending June 2008. They spent 41% of the cash revenues on fundraising and administration; $11,905,507 on fundraising (33.9%) and a further $2,710,783 on management (7.7%).
 The organization was listed with the Forbes 2005 200 Largest U.S. Charities.
 Operation Smile is a member of the Independent Charities of America. 
 Operation Smile meets 19 of the 20 standards for charities established by the Better Business Bureau Wise Giving Alliance, but fails to meet the "Compensated Board Members" standard, because two of the eleven board members (the husband and wife co-founders) are compensated directly or indirectly, which exceeds the standard's limit of 10%.

Operation Smile in popular culture
 A 2007 multimedia project featured a seven-story sphere at South Street Seaport in New York, NY. Microsoft worked with Operation Smile, Digital Kitchen (a design firm) and the Wexley School for Girls (Seattle, WA) to have photographic images of visitors projected onto the sphere. [(See also: Case Study)]
 A 2005 movie, Smile, directed by Jeffrey Kramer was loosely based on the experiences of a student Operation Smile volunteer.
 Singer Jessica Simpson, and television hosts Billy Bush and Nicole Lapin volunteer on behalf of Operation Smile.
Actress Roma Downey has been an ambassador for the Virginia-based nonprofit Operation Smile for 20 years.
 Singer Mariah Carey volunteered for The Smile Collection fundraising event in New York in 2006.
 Operation Smile was featured on NBC's reality show The Apprentice, Thursday, April 15, 2004.
 Operation Smile is referenced repeatedly on Bravo's teen reality show NYC Prep.
 Operation Smile is referenced in episode 3 of TNT's television series Franklin & Bash.
Celebrity plastic surgeon Michael Obeng began his career with Operation Smile in Ghana.
 In January 2014, Gawker published an article regarding Operation Smile's interviewing process, which includes throwing a party for 40 people.
Chrissy Metz and Milo Ventimiglia, actors on the famous This Is Us television show, are supporters of Operation Smile.
In 2016, Kate Hudson accepted the Universal Smile Award for her long time support with Operation Smile.

Co-branding

 In 2002, Operation Smile was featured in a Mr. Potato Head contest, with proceeds to benefit the NGO. Hasbro donated Mr. Potato Head toys for Operation Smile missions.
 An ongoing co-branding campaign between Operation Smile and Sephora combines the NGO's name with the companies products, raising over $400,000 for the NGO. The Operation Smile Sephora Lip Baume was listed at number five on Lara Spencer's "Lara's Hot Shopping List, Hot Products for Women".
 An ongoing co-branding campaign between Operation Smile and AriZona Iced Tea features the tea company's three best selling (one liter) products' labels replaced with Operation Smile branded messaging, mission statement and photos of children with cleft repairs.
 In 2007 Lladró unveiled a collection of porcelain, including a piece inspired by Gustav Klimt's painting The Kiss, proceeds from which were to benefit the NGO.
In February 2018, Operation Smile partnered with Lay's potato chips that allotted a 1 million dollar cap for donation. The bags that hit the shelf on February 12 displayed a happy smile at the opening. The bags will appear only once more on the shelves on April 7. Lay’s has also engaged fans with its Lay’s Smile Experience, a three-day pop-up in New York’s Time Square from Feb. 8-10, and has the support of musician, actress and Operation Smile ambassador Jordin Sparks.

Headquarters relocation
In 2007, Operation Smile announced relocation of its headquarters from Norfolk, Virginia to a new building in Virginia Beach.

See also
 Cleft lip and palate organisations
 Oral and maxillofacial surgery

References

External links

 
 Operation Smile at Hoovers.com

International charities
Health charities in the United States
Oral and maxillofacial surgery organizations
Non-profit organizations based in Virginia Beach, Virginia
1982 establishments in Virginia
Medical and health organizations based in Virginia